State Elementary School Pondok Kelapa 07 Pagi is an Indonesian public school in Komplek Perumkar Pemda DKI Pondok Kelapa, Kecamatan Duren Sawit, Jakarta Timur. This school sharing the same building with:
 State Elementary School Pondok Kelapa 09 Pagi
 State Elementary School Pondok Kelapa 11 Petang dan
 State Elementary School Pondok Kelapa 12 Petang

External links

References

Schools in Jakarta